Lucy Hayes Herron Laughlin Lippitt (November 8, 1877 – July 27, 1961) was an American socialite and amateur golfer.

Early life 
Herron was born in 1877 in Cincinnati, Ohio, the daughter of John Williamson Herron, a lawyer, and Harriet Anne Collins Herron. Her older sister, Helen Herron Taft, was the first lady of the United States, the wife of president William Howard Taft. Lucy was baptized in the White House and named for Lucy Webb Hayes, the wife of John Williamson Herron's close friend, president Rutherford B. Hayes. Some sources give her birth date as 1878 or 1879 (including her tombstone), but she was "born shortly after the election of Mr. Hayes" and named for the new first lady, which places her birth and baptism in 1877.

Her maternal grandfather Ela Collins was a Congressman in the 1820s, as was an uncle, William Collins. Another uncle, Isaac Clinton Collins, was an Ohio state legislator and a judge.

Golf 
Herron was a serious amateur golfer, a member of the Cincinnati Golf Club. Because she was from Ohio instead of the East Coast, she was considered a "Western" golfer: "Miss Herron, who is strong on the putting green, is another one of the formidable golfers, who, of both sexes, the West is sending out to test Eastern skill to its utmost," commented one publication at the time. Her swing was described as "beautiful" "quick, machine-like" by colleagues. In 1897, she finished in third place at the U.S. Women's Amateur, and returned in 1898.  In 1899, she won the Women's Golf Association Trophy in Philadelphia. She reached the finals of the 1901 U.S. Women's Amateur, held at Baltusrol Golf Club, where she was defeated by Genevieve Hecker. Frances C. Griscom listed her among the top women golfers in the United States.

Personal life 
Herron's first husband was steel company executive Thomas McKennan Laughlin, the brother of ambassador Irwin B. Laughlin. They married in 1903, and she was widowed when he died by suicide in 1910. They had two sons, William K. Laughlin and Thomas Irwin Laughlin. In 1911, she was rumored to be engaged to Archibald Butt, and aide to President Taft. She denied the rumors, and they did not marry; in 1912 he died on the Titanic.  

Her second husband was Senator Henry Frederick Lippitt; they married, both for the second time, in 1915. With Lippitt she had another son, Frederick Lippitt, who became a congressman, and a daughter, Mary Ann Lippitt, who was a pilot during World War II and owned an aviation company in Rhode Island. She was widowed again when Lippitt died in 1933. She died in 1961, in Providence, Rhode Island. She left an estate reported to be worth eight million dollars, with significant gifts to children's, medical, and cultural charities in Rhode Island. Neither of her Lippitt children married; they were both major benefactors of Brown University and in 2004 were jointly awarded the President's Medal for their contributions to the school. Her grave is with her second husband's and her younger children's, at Swan Point Cemetery in Providence. 

Her notable nephews and nieces included Robert A. Taft, Helen Taft Manning, and Charles Phelps Taft II.

References

External links 
 

American female golfers
Amateur golfers
Golfers from Ohio
American socialites
People from Cincinnati
1877 births
1961 deaths